Hunt of a Lifetime is a nonprofit organization dedicated to fulfilling hunting and fishing related wishes of children 21 and under with life-threatening illnesses.

History 
In 1998, Hunt of a Lifetime founder Tina Pattison decided to grant the wish of her stepson, Matt, diagnosed with lymphoma, and began to raise money for a moose-hunting trip. Matt was 19 and too old to qualify for help from the Make-A-Wish Foundation. However, Pattison sent him on the trip after raising funds from hunters and hunting-supply companies in the US and Canada.

In 1999, Matt died of lymphoma. In that same year, the Make-A-Wish Foundation, responding to criticisms from animal rights groups and concerns over child safety, ceased granting hunting-related wishes. Cash donations collected at Matt's funeral were used to start the foundation.

References

Further reading
Lancaster Online
The Victoria Advocate (via Associated Press)
Herald Journal
Field & Stream
The Argus-Press
Bangor Daily News (continued on p. B5, scroll right)
WAGM Television

External links
 Hunt of a Lifetime Homepage

Children's charities based in the United States
Charities based in Pennsylvania
Hunting organizations